The Lithuanian Women's Curling Championship is the national championship of women's curling in Lithuania. It has been held annually since 2006 and organized by the Lithuanian Curling Association.

Championship is held in conjunction with Lithuanian Men's Curling Championship.

In 2013 championship was "absolute" - for men's, women's and mixed teams.

List of champions
Teams line-up in order: fourth, third, second, lead, alternate, coach; skips marked in bold.

References

See also
Lithuanian Men's Curling Championship